Mark Butterfield (born July 14, 1974) is a former American football quarterback who played for the Stanford Cardinal from 1992 to 1995. Butterfield was also a member of the Arizona Cardinals and Chicago Bears of the National Football League. He later spent time with the Scottish Claymores and Frankfurt Galaxy of the NFL Europe.

Collegiate career
Butterfield was a three-sport athlete for Antioch High School, participating in baseball, basketball and football. He was considered the 7th best quarterback in the nation during the 1992 recruiting cycle and ultimately signed with Stanford.

Butterfield spent his first three seasons on campus as backup to Steve Stenstrom. Upon assuming starting duties in his senior year, Butterfield accumulated 2,533 passing yards, 19 touchdown passes and 9 interceptions on a 58.3% completion rate. Stanford had a 7-3-1 record during the regular season, losing the 1995 Liberty Bowl to East Carolina. He earned second-team All-Pac 10 honors for his efforts.

Professional career
After going undrafted in 1996, Butterfield joined the Arizona Cardinals practice squad. The Chicago Bears signed Butterfield to their active roster in response to a string of injuries suffered by multiple quarterbacks, including former Stanford teammate Steve Stenstrom. He served as the Bears' third string quarterback.

Butterfield would later spend time in NFL Europe, which included durations with the Scottish Claymores and Frankfurt Galaxy.

Personal life
Butterfield is father to Jay Butterfield, a University of Oregon commit who was rated as the 5th overall pro style quarterback prospect in the 2020 recruiting cycle by 24/7 Sports.

References

Living people
1974 births
People from Antioch, California
American football quarterbacks
Scottish Claymores players
Frankfurt Galaxy players
Arizona Cardinals players
Chicago Bears players
Stanford Cardinal football players